The White Mountain Open was a golf tournament on the LPGA Tour, played only in 1955. It was played in Bethlehem, New Hampshire at three different courses: Bethlehem Country Club, Maplewood Country Club, and Mount Washington Golf Club. Betty Jameson won the event.

References

Former LPGA Tour events
Golf in New Hampshire
Sports competitions in New Hampshire
History of women in New Hampshire